"Get Away"  is a Korean artist Rottyful Sky's second single album. It was released on 12 February 2013 by R's company (Korea). On the same day, R's company (Korea) also released the "Get Away" MV on official YouTube channel.

This is the last digital single by Rottyful Sky before she died on 8 October 2013.

Track listing

Release history

Music videos

Official Website
Official Website
Official Cyworld - hanul88

References 

2013 singles